Mary Louise Lester (January 19, 1919 – December 20, 1977), later known as Mary Louise Luster, was an American infielder who played in the All-American Girls Professional Baseball League. She was born in Nashville, Tennessee.

Mary Louise Lester was one of the original founding members of the All-American Girls Professional Baseball League in its 1943 inaugural season.

In 1943, Lester attended the final tryouts of the league at Wrigley Field. Once the final cut was made, Lester and another 59 of the 280 girls who tried out were chosen to become the first women to ever play professional baseball. She was relocated to the Kenosha Comets, playing for them one year before joining the South Bend Blue Sox in the  1944 season.

Lester was used as a backup infielder, serving primarily as a backup at second base while hitting a .186 average in 112 career games. She could not be reached after leaving the league in 1944.

She died in Nashville on December 20, 1977, at the age of 58.

Career statistics
Batting 

Fielding

References

External links

1919 births
1977 deaths
All-American Girls Professional Baseball League players
Baseball players from Tennessee
Kenosha Comets players
People from Nashville, Tennessee
South Bend Blue Sox players